Mrahori Saddle (‘Sedlovina Mrahori’ \se-dlo-vi-'na mra-'ho-ri\) is the ice-covered saddle of elevation 1102 m on Nordenskjöld Coast in Graham Land, Antarctica linking Kyustendil Ridge to the north to Lovech Heights to the south.  It is part of the glacial divide between Rogosh Glacier and Zlokuchene Glacier.

The feature is named after the settlement of Mrahori in northern Bulgaria.

Location
British mapping in 1978.

Maps
 Antarctic Digital Database (ADD). Scale 1:250000 topographic map of Antarctica. Scientific Committee on Antarctic Research (SCAR). Since 1993, regularly upgraded and updated.

Notes

References
 Mrahori Saddle. SCAR Composite Antarctic Gazetteer.
 Bulgarian Antarctic Gazetteer. Antarctic Place-names Commission. (details in Bulgarian, basic data in English)

External links
 Mrahori Saddle. Copernix satellite image

Mountain passes of Graham Land
Nordenskjöld Coast
Bulgaria and the Antarctic